Irma Lovisa Hilda Helin (born 18 June 1994) is a Swedish former football midfielder who played for Djurgårdens IF Fotboll of the Damallsvenskan. In October 2016 she won her first cap for the Sweden women's national football team in a 7–0 win over Iran. She is married to ice hockey player Mika Zibanejad.

References

External links

 
 
 Irma Helin at Piteå IF 
 Irma Helin at Linköpings FC 
 

1994 births
Living people
Swedish women's footballers
Sweden women's international footballers
Djurgårdens IF Fotboll (women) players
Linköpings FC players
Damallsvenskan players
Piteå IF (women) players
Women's association football midfielders
NiceFutis players
Expatriate women's footballers in Finland
Footballers from Stockholm